Lech Woszczerowicz (born 8 May 1940 in Lwów) is a Polish politician. He was elected to the Sejm on 25 September 2005, getting 5987 votes in 26 Gdynia district as a candidate from the Samoobrona Rzeczpospolitej Polskiej list.

See also
Members of Polish Sejm 2005-2007

External links
Lech Woszczerowicz - parliamentary page - includes declarations of interest, voting record, and transcripts of speeches.

1940 births
Living people
Politicians from Lviv
Members of the Polish Sejm 2005–2007
Self-Defence of the Republic of Poland politicians